Sericaglaea is a genus of moths of the family Noctuidae.

Species
 Sericaglaea adulta (Guenée, 1852)
 Sericaglaea signata (French, 1879)

References
Natural History Museum Lepidoptera genus database
Sericaglaea at funet

Cuculliinae